Riku Pitkänen (born 18 July 1991) is a Finnish ice hockey forward currently playing for Rødovre Mighty Bulls of the Danish Metal Ligaen.

References

External links
 

1991 births
Living people
Lukko players
Finnish ice hockey forwards
Herning Blue Fox players
Rødovre Mighty Bulls players